was a daimyō in early Edo period Japan under the Tokugawa shogunate and the 20th head of the Satake clan and 2nd of Kubota Domain in Dewa Province. His courtesy title was Sakonoeshōshō and Jijū and his Court rank was Junior Fourth Rank, Lower Grade.

Biography
Yoshitaka was born in 1609 as the eldest son of Iwaki Sadataka, the 3rd son of Satake Yoshishige. His mother was the daughter of Sōma Yoshitane.<ref name="Shichinomiya"

On the death of his father in 1620, he became daimyō of Shinano-Nakamura Domain (10,000 koku), taking the name of Iwaki Yoshitaka. This was a small domain in what is now Nagano Prefecture, awarded to the once illustrious Iwaki clan after the Battle of Osaka.  In 1622, his kokudaka were increased by 10,000 koku in Yuri District, Dewa Province, and in November 1623, he moved his seat from Shinano-Nakamura to that location, where he built a jin'ya. This was the beginning of Kameda Domain which would last to the Meiji restoration. Yoshitaka was awarded lower 5th court rank and the courtesy title of Shuri-Daiyu in December 1624.

Yoshitaka was adopted as heir by his uncle, Satake Yoshinobu of Kubota Domain in April 1626, following the disinheritance of Yoshinobu’s son Satake Yoshinao for incompetence, and was given the name Satake Yoshitaka. He turned Kameda Domain over to his younger brother. On April 27, 1626, he was presented in formal audience to Tokugawa Hidetada and Tokugawa Iemitsu, and was awarded lower 4th court rank and the courtesy title of Jijū (侍従). Yoshitaka was awarded an estate of 50,000 koku in November 1630 by his adoptive father, who exhibited no signs of intending to retire or relax his control over Kubota Domain. However, on Yoshinobu’s death on February 26, 1633, Yoshitaka finally succeeded to the leadership of the clan. He was permitted to formally enter the domain for the first time on May 8, 1633. On December 28, 1666, his court title was promoted to “General of the Left Imperial Guard” (左近衛少将). He died at Kubota Castle on December 5, 1671.

His official wife was the daughter of Satake Yoshiaki, and he is known to have had at least two concubines. His eldest son, Yoshioki predeceased him at the age of 22, and Yoshioki’s son became daimyō of Kubota-Shinden Domain. Yoshitaka’s second son, Satake Yoshizumi inherited Kubota Domain.<ref name="Shichinomiya"

References
  

1607 births
1671 deaths
Satake clan
Tozama daimyo
People of Edo-period Japan